Carlos Alberto Pereira Villalba (born January 17, 1996) is a Paraguayan footballer who plays as a right midfielder for Cerro Porteño.

References

External links
 
 
 

1996 births
Living people
Paraguayan footballers
Paraguayan Primera División players
Club Sportivo San Lorenzo footballers
Cerro Porteño players
Association football defenders
Sportspeople from Asunción